Debi Roy (born 4 August 1940) is one of the founding fathers of the Hungry generation movement in Bengali literature. He is also the first modern Dalit poet in Bengali. He was born in a very poor family and worked as an errand boy in tea stalls of Calcutta when his parents lived in a slum in Howrah. He funded his own education and became a graduate of Calcutta University. He started writing in his childhood. Debi Roy met Malay Roy Choudhury in an office of a literary periodical in 1960 and the two of them, after discussions with Shakti Chattopadhyay and Samir Roychoudhury launched the now famous Hungryalist movement in November 1961. His Howrah slum-room was the editorial office from where the Hungryalist Bulletins and Hungryalist Manifestoes were published. Along with ten other Hungryalists, Debi Roy was arrested in 1964 on charges of obscenity in poetry, though the trial court exonerated him.

He developed new kinds of sentences in his poems which have come to be known as logical breaks as well as image jumping. Subsequent Bengali poets have followed the method into the next century. As a result, he is considered one of the first postmodern Bengali poets.

Poetry collections by Debi Roy
Unmad Shahar
Kolkata O Aami
Manush Manush
Sampratik Tinjan
Debi Royer Kobita
Bhrukutir Birudhdhey Eka
Ei Sei Tomar Desh
Putulnaacher Gaan
Sarbohara Tabu Ahankar
Bharatvarsha Tomay Khunjchhey
Aaguner Gaan
Ekushey February
Nirbachito Kobita

References
Debi Roy Alochanasamagra (2004). Edited by Swaraj Sengupta.
Kobita: Shaatha-Sottor (1982). Edited by Dr. Uttam Das, Mrtyunjay Sen and Paresh Mandal.
Hungry, Shruti O Shastrovirodhi Andolon (1986). Written by Dr. Uttam Das.
Khsudhito Prajanmo (1995). Written by Dr. Uttam Das.
Ekaler Gadyo Podyo Andoloner Dalil (1970). Written by Satya Guha.
Yabajantrana O Sahitya (1968). Dr Aloke Ranjan Dasgupta.
Krittibas (1966). Edited by Sunil Gangopadhyay.
Hungry Kimbadanti (1994). Written by Malay Roy Choudhury.
Uttorprabashi (1986). Edited by Gajendra Kumar Ghosh.
Vantulsi Ka Gandh. (1988). Written by Phanishwarnath 'Renu'
Salted Feathers (1967). Edited by Dick Bakken.
Intrepid (1967). Edited by Allan De Loach.

External links
"The Hungry Generation". Time. November 20, 1964
Debi Roy along with the Hungryalists

20th-century Bengali poets
Poets from West Bengal
Indian postmodern writers
20th-century Indian poets
Bengali-language poets
University of Calcutta alumni
Hungry generation
1940 births
Living people
Bengali male poets
Indian male poets
20th-century Indian male writers